John A. Mirisch is an American politician and former film studio executive. He is currently a city council member of Beverly Hills, California. He also served as mayor from 2013 to 2014, from 2016 to 2017, and from 2019 to 2020.

Early life 
John A. Mirisch was born to a wealthy family in Beverly Hills. He has a brother and a step-sister, the daughter of his mother's second husband Leonard Goldberg. His grandfather, Harold Mirisch, alongside his great-uncles Walter Mirisch (1921–2023) and Marvin Mirisch (1918–2002), founded the Mirisch Company in 1957. He attended Hawthorne Elementary and Beverly Hills High School. He graduated from Yale University magna cum laude in 1985.

Career 
Mirisch began his career at 20th Century Fox. He later worked as managing director of the Austrian office of United International Pictures, following by the Swedish office. He served on the boards of the Austrian and Swedish Film Distributors' Associations and the Swedish Academy Awards Selection Committee. He worked as an executive both at IMAX and at Paramount Pictures.

Mirisch was elected to the Beverly Hills City Council in 2009. As councilor, he opposed plans to annex Holmby Hills, Los Angeles as part of the city of Beverly Hills. He served as vice mayor of Beverly Hills in 2012, and became mayor for the first time in 2013.

During his tenure as mayor, Mirisch established the Sunshine Task Force to improve local governmental transparency and public participation. He has also spearheaded the Beverly Hills Cultural Heritage Commission to honor the city's rich history and architectural legacy. His first term ended in March 2014, when Lili Bosse was sworn in as mayor.

Mirisch is a vocal opponent of eliminating single-family neighborhoods with forced housing density, leading to conflict with YIMBY activists.

Mirisch served his second term as mayor from March 2016 to March 2017 and began his third term as mayor in March 2019.

Personal life 
Mirisch has two sons. He is a member of the Geelong Football Club of the Australian Football League. He is a dual Swedish-American citizen and also a citizen of Canada.

In 2016, the city of Beverly Hills was ordered to pay $9,357 in legal fees to a journalist who filed suit for release of police records related to alleged domestic abuse by Mirisch. The records included incident reports from police visits to Mirisch's home. An affidavit filed by Magdalena Mirisch for a restraining order during divorce proceedings in 2011 claimed that Mirisch emotionally abused her and was neglectful toward their son.

In the next election for Beverly Hills City Council on March 5, 2017, Mirisch was re-elected, placing first in a field of eight candidates.

References 

Living people
Year of birth missing (living people)
American people of Polish-Jewish descent
Jewish American people in California politics
Jewish mayors of places in the United States
Beverly Hills High School alumni
Yale University alumni
Paramount Pictures executives
Mayors of Beverly Hills, California
California Republicans
John A.